C. giganteus may refer to:
 Chorus giganteus, a sea snail species
 Cordylus giganteus, the giant girdled lizard, a lizard species
 Cryptanthus giganteus, a plant species endemic to Brazil
 Cynosurus giganteus, a grass species in the genus Cynosurus
 Cyperus giganteus, the piripiri, a plant species native to central Mexico as far south as Uruguay

Synonyms
 Cereus giganteus, a synonym for Carnegiea gigantea, the saguaro, a cactus species native to the U.S. states of Arizona and California and to the Mexican state of Sonora
 Crotalus giganteus, a synonym for Crotalus adamanteus, a venomous pitviper species found in the southeastern United States